Atissa is a genus of shore flies in the family Ephydridae.

Species
A. antennalis Aldrich, 1931
A. hepaticoloris Becker, 1903
A. kairensis Becker, 1903
A. kerteszi Papp, 1974
A. limosina Becker, 1896
A. litoralis (Cole, 1912)
A. luteipes Cresson, 1944
A. mimula Cresson, 1931
A. oahuensis Cresson, 1948
A. pygmaea (Haliday, 1833)
A. suturalis Cresson, 1929

References

Ephydridae
Brachycera genera
Taxa named by Alexander Henry Haliday